Education Scotland is an executive agency of the Scottish Government, tasked with improving the quality of the country's education system.

Origins 
The creation of the Agency was announced by Scottish Government Education and Lifelong Learning Cabinet Minister Michael Russell on 14 October 2010.

It was intended to bring to together the work and responsibilities of Her Majesty's Inspectorate of Education and Learning and Teaching Scotland  and was originally entitled the Scottish Education Quality and Improvement Agency (SEQIA).

The name was later changed to Education Scotland and the agency was established under this name on 1 July 2011.

On establishment Education Scotland also incorporated the Scottish Government Positive Behaviour Team, which aims to support Scottish schools and local authorities to introduce and embed approaches that promote positive relationships and behaviour, and the National CPD Team, which aims to provide strategic support for continuing professional development (CPD) and professional review throughout Scottish education.

Remit 

Education Scotland's core purpose and strategic priorities are:

 to lead and support successful implementation of the curriculum
 to build the capacity of education providers and practitioners to improve their own performance
 to promote high quality professional learning and leadership
 to stimulate creativity and innovation
 to provide independent evaluation on the quality of educational provision
 to provide evidence-based advice to inform national policy
 to develop its people and improve its organisational capability

Key areas of work 

Evaluation of the quality of learning and teaching in Scottish schools and education services through Inspection and review of Scottish education

Provision of support and resources for learning and teaching via the Education Scotland online service.

References

External links 
 

Executive agencies of the Scottish Government
Educational organisations based in Scotland
2011 establishments in Scotland
Government agencies established in 2011
Organisations based in West Lothian
Livingston, West Lothian